Badminton at the 2007 All-Africa Games was held from July 13 to July 19, 2007 in Algiers, Algeria.

Venue
Salle OMS El Biar, El Biar (Algiers)

Medalists

Final results

Medal count

References
All Africa Games 2007
Newsletter du Mois de Juillet 2007
Nigeria overwhelms S. Africa in All-Africa Games badminton, published by Xinhua on 2007-07-16; retrieved 2011-09-01.

2007 All-Africa Games
2007
All-Africa Games
Badminton tournaments in Algeria